The World Wrestling Alliance is used by several regional and independent professional wrestling promotions, which include: 

 World Wrestling Alliance, a failed 1987 split from the National Wrestling Alliance formed by Kansas City-based Bob Geigel; see Heart of America Sports Attractions
 World Wrestling Alliance (Massachusetts), an American independent promotion based in New England and founded by Mike Sparta and Brittany Brown

See also 
 World Wrestling Association (disambiguation)
 WWA (disambiguation)